Waltheria tomentosa is a species of flowering plant in the family Malvaceae which is endemic to the Marquesas Islands. The species was described by Johann Reinhold Forster and Georg Forster.

References

Byttnerioideae